The United States Marine Corps is tasked by Department of Defense directive to "conduct complex expeditionary operations in the urban littorals and other challenging environments" and "conduct amphibious operations, including engagement, crisis response, and power
projection operations to assure access." Before 2006 (i.e., the formation of the Marine Corps Special Operations Command (MARSOC)), the Marine Corps was the only branch of the Armed Forces that did not have any of its special warfare elements participating in the United States Special Operations Command (USSOCOM), due to confining its special operations capabilities only for the purpose to the Fleet Marine Force.

President Ronald Reagan approved the establishment of USSOCOM in April 1987; a month later the other military branches reassigned their own respective special operations forces (SOF) units to the USSOCOM Headquarters in Tampa, Florida at MacDill Air Force Base. However, as the Marine Corps was reluctant to release control of Marine units, its specialized assets assigned to the FMF's Marine Air-Ground Task Forces remained separate and have evolved to fulfill a separate niche of tasks, specific and limited in scope, in direct support of a Marine Expeditionary Unit's commander.

This evolution occurred due to the direction of Commandant of the Marine Corps General Alfred M. Gray, who announced on 5 February 1988, that in response to the current and projected realities of the world, they were changing the designations of the Marine Air-Ground Task Forces that constitute its fighting formations. The word "amphibious" was replaced by "expeditionary". The new term signified that the Marine Corps would not be limited to amphibious operations but rather would be capable of a wide spectrum of operations in littoral areas around the world, in conventional and unconventional warfare. Since then, the Marine Corps transitioned has back to amphibious operations. 

The term Special Operations Capable was exclusively used by the Marine Corps and not recognized by United States Special Operations Command. No other US Armed Forces branch used to term to refer to units with enhanced capability. The Marine Corps Special Operations Command was created in 2006. Since 2013, no Marine Corps unit includes "special operations capable" in its title and the term has fallen in disuse.

Active units

United States Marine Corps Reconnaissance Battalions

Recon Battalions are the Special Operations Capable reconnaissance assets of Marine Air-Ground Task Force that provide division-level ground and amphibious reconnaissance to the Ground Combat Element within the United States Marine Corps. Including premier units such as United States Marine Corps Force Reconnaissance. Division reconnaissance teams are employed to observe and report on enemy activity and other information of military significance in close operations. The Military Occupational Specialty code for Reconnaissance Marine is 0321.

Air Naval Gunfire Liaison Company

The Air Naval Gunfire Liaison Company, or ANGLICO, are small Marine units that provide artillery, naval gunfire, close air support for the United States Armed Forces, as well to allied foreign armed forces worldwide. The ANGLICO teams are specialized in forward observation, joint terminal attack controlling, and forward air controlling. They give the Marine Air Ground Task Force commanders a liaison capability with foreign area expertise to plan, coordinate, employ and conduct radio communications for air, sea and land support fire for joint, allied and coalition forces. They also have parachutists used to insert into the battlefield rapidly for observance support.

Chemical Biological Incident Response Force

The Chemical Biological Incident Response Force is a rapid response force that is capable of being deployed to a combatant commander or United States Department of State legations and installations, and, when directed by the National Command Authority, anywhere in the world that is affected by chemical, biological, radiological, nuclear, or high-yield explosive (CBRNE) incidents. The force is completely self-contained and self-sufficient, and may also provide coordinating initial relief efforts, security, detection, identification, expert medical advice, and limited decontamination of personnel and equipment.

This response force will respond to CBRNE incidents affecting to assist local civilian and military agencies in order to assist the on-scene commander in providing initial post incident consequence management. CBIRF consists of specially trained personnel and specialized equipment suited for operations in a wide range of contingencies. Through search and extraction, decontamination, and medical stabilization, CBIRF capabilities are intended to minimize the effects of a CBRNE incident.

MAGTF Reconnaissance

Marine reconnaissance are specialized teams that are proficient in special, ground and amphibious reconnaissance to collect intelligence for the commanders within the Marine Air-Ground Task Force to shape the commander's battlespace. The division recon assets conduct recon for battalions and regiments by operating ahead of the forces to scout enemy and other pertinent information. The force recon assets are reserved for the high-echelon of the force commander. Force recon also may be directed to perform direct action operations or other special assignments to the Marine Expeditionary Force.

Marine Special Operations Command

The Marine Special Operations Teams (MSOTs), are the Marine Corps's only fully committed, unconventional special operations unit that solely operate independently from the Fleet Marine Force. Their initial role is to provide the Marine Special Operation Command (MARSOC) in direct action, special reconnaissance, counter-terrorism, and foreign internal defense. It first began as MCSOCOM Detachment One and consequently was reformed into a Marine Special Operations Battalion (MSOB). Most of the experienced personnel were from the disbanded FMF's recon companies of 1st and 2nd Force Recon and from a Naval Special Warfare Group; forming the 1st and 2nd MSOB.

Maritime Special Purpose Force

The United States Marine Corps' Maritime Special Purpose Force (MSPF), are specialized sub-units of the Marine Expeditionary Units. They are deployed to give commanders low profile, two-platoon surgical emplacement in accessible littoral regions. The MSPF provides the MEU with rapid direct action capabilities, augmenting or replacing the unavailable Fleet Marine Force's recon platoons. It enables the Marine Corps's only deep recon unit, Force Recon, to continue providing FMF-level intelligence without delay. However, MSPFs can not operate independently of their parent MEU: they rely solely on the MEU for logistics, intelligence, communications, transportation, and fire support.

Special Reaction Teams
The Provost Marshal's Special Reaction Teams (SRT) are specialized military policemen that are trained in all aspects of special weapons and tactics. They have the ability to handle special threat situations surpassing normal law enforcement capabilities, such as: isolating a crisis scene, providing proficient marksmanship support, tactically responding from an assembly area to the scene, effecting an entry, and employing clearing techniques.

Fleet Anti-terrorism Security Teams

Fleet Anti-terrorism Security Teams (FAST) are independent, worldwide deployable platoons of specially trained Marines that are prepared to defend against terrorist threats to American interests on extremely short notice. Providing limited duration expeditionary site security to vital national assets, these platoons work directly for the Fleet Admiral of 5th, 6th, and 7th Fleets, and receive tasking via the Department of State or the military Geographic Combatant Commander of the respective region. These platoons are manned by selected infantrymen, commanded by a Captain, and in addition to standard USMC infantry tasks, they are proficient in: precision weapons employment, convoy security, embarked and airfield security, low profile operations, population control measures and riot disbursal, CBRN defense, non-lethal weapons employment, embarkation and self-supporting logistics, fast roping, small arms marksmanship, machine guns and machine gun gunnery, COC operations, satellite communications, and inter-operability with host nation forces, local guard forces, joint, interagency, and allied partners. Their motto is "Deter, Detect, Defend" and they are nicknamed "Gunslingers". They are employed frequently in military operations other than war (MOOTW).

Recapture Tactics Teams
The Recapture Tactics Team or RTT specializes In-Extremis Hostage Rescue (IEHR) and Nuclear Counter-Proliferation (NCP). RTT units are attached to Nuclear Weapon Stations aboard US naval installations and do not deploy. Where as FAST Platoons deploy to areas in need of naval security operations, RTT has no need to deploy because they are already positioned in the appropriate strategic locations where they are most needed.

The Marine Corps Security Forces Regiment's Close Quarters Battle Teams also go to various installations as Mobile Training Teams to teach CQB course to units such as but are not limited to: military police special reaction teams, other military branches (both American and allied), and law enforcement organizations (federal, state, county, local and international/foreign).

Inactivated units

Amphibious Reconnaissance Battalion

The Amphibious Reconnaissance Company (and later Battalion) were a small group of men that conducted preliminary D-Day amphibious reconnaissance of the planned littoral beaches occupied by the Imperial Japanese Army and Special Naval Landing Forces in the Central Pacific during World War II. They were infantry Marines highly skilled in combat swimming, topography, and hydrographic survey that provided the V Amphibious Corps, which subsequently was redesignated under the Fleet Marine Force, Pacific, vital military intelligence of Japanese enemy forces.

Combined Action Program

The Combined Action Program (CAP), was a unit that was assembled as a foreign internal defense during the Vietnam War. They were jointly allied with the South Vietnamese Popular Force, providing  'civil protection force' for local villages from the Viet Cong's influence of terrorism, recruiting, and taxation.

Later, they were subsequently renamed the "Civil Action Platoons". The foreign relations between the two allied forces confided the villagers of in-sourcing information. It became one of the major sources of reliable intelligence from allies throughout the war.

Joint Assault Signals Company

The Joint Assault Signals Company (JASCO) were a tri-service of the Army and the Fleet Marine Force (United States Navy/Marine Corps) that provided supporting arms coordination for ground artillery, ships, and aircraft in delivering ordnance. They were highly specialized fire support coordinators for close air and naval gunfire support.

Marine Special Operations Command Detachment One

The MCSOCOM Detachment One (MarDet 1) was a pilot program to assess the value of Marine special operations forces permanently detached to the United States Special Operations Command. It was commanded by Col. Robert J. Coates, former commanding officer of 1st Force Reconnaissance Company along with Team leader Lt. Lawrence R. Gentile 1st Forecon Jump Master. Det 1 was activated on 19 June 2003 and had its headquarters at Camp Del Mar Boat Basin. It was disbanded in 2006 and succeeded by the permanent Marine Forces Special Operations Command, which is to be a 2700-person command.

Marine Corps Test Unit #1

The Marine Corps Test Unit (MCTU #1) was a battalion-sized unit that was designed to be outside the political and command boundaries of the Fleet Marine Force to test and evaluate innovative methods in maneuvering ground forces that were prone to operating in areas subject to nuclear attacks. They initially developed the techniques for the heliborne assaults that are used in the Army and Navy today.

The Test Unit's infantry battalion participated in Desert Rock IV during shot 'Bee'. The reconnaissance platoon in MCTU #1 revolutionized the modern methods of parachute insertions and extractions. The Recon Platoon subsequently became the beginning of Force Reconnaissance.

Observer Group

The Observer Group (precursor to Amphibious Reconnaissance Company) was a joint Army–Marine Corps unit that was the first in the United States and the Fleet Marine Force to be organized and trained specifically for amphibious reconnaissance. The Observer group experimented in the methodology and equipment in projecting "ship-to-shore" reconnaissance from the sea before the establishment of the Office of Strategic Services (the precursor to the Central Intelligence Agency), the Underwater Demolition Teams, and before the United States Army Special Forces and Air Commandos. It was also the birth of naval amphibious intelligence.

Parachute battalions

The Paramarines (also known as Marine paratroopers) were specialized units that were trained to parachute into combat. The first Paramarines were trained in October 1940. The Parachute battalions have jumped into hostile territory. They lacked heavy mortar and machine gun support due to the amount of equipment they were able to carry into combat in addition to having limited manpower. They were lightly equipped for many of the missions in the Pacific campaigns during World War II.

By 1944, the Parachute Battalions was disbanded, becoming another special operations unit deactivated under the Fleet Marine Force just like the Marine Raiders.

Raider battalions

The Marine Raiders were elite units established in 1942 by the Marine Corps during World War II to conduct amphibious, light-infantry raiding missions, particularly in landing in rubber boats and operating behind the lines. "Edson's Raiders of 1st Marine Raiders Battalion and "Carlson's" Raiders of 2nd Marine Raiders Battalion are said to be the first United States Special Operations Forces to form and see combat.

Many  modern raiding methods in the Marine Corps were derived and adopted by both Carlson's and Edson's Raiders, which subsequently the division-level recon scouts continued its long use after they were disbanded in 1944. It became known as direct action (DA) mission of today. Most of the experienced Raiders, along with the Paramarines, soon filled the ranks of division recon companies.

Anti-Terrorism Battalion

The Anti-Terrorism Battalion was a specialized anti-terrorist task unit that possessed organic and supplemental capabilities in military intelligence and counter-intelligence, combat engineers, nuclear, biological and chemical (NBC) teams, and advanced riflemen. On short notice, they would have deployed in response to crises during terrorist attacks. They would have also supplemented other NBC agencies as human intelligence exploitation teams (HET).

References

Inactive units of the United States Marine Corps